Ghulam Raziq (11 November 1932 – 24 June 1989) was a Pakistani hurdler who competed in the 1956 Summer Olympics, in the 1960 Summer Olympics, and in the 1964 Summer Olympics. He lived in Domeli District Jhelum Pakistan

References

1932 births
1989 deaths
Pakistani male hurdlers
Olympic athletes of Pakistan
Athletes (track and field) at the 1956 Summer Olympics
Athletes (track and field) at the 1960 Summer Olympics
Athletes (track and field) at the 1964 Summer Olympics
Asian Games gold medalists for Pakistan
Asian Games silver medalists for Pakistan
Asian Games bronze medalists for Pakistan
Asian Games medalists in athletics (track and field)
Athletes (track and field) at the 1958 Asian Games
Athletes (track and field) at the 1962 Asian Games
Athletes (track and field) at the 1966 Asian Games
Commonwealth Games medallists in athletics
Commonwealth Games gold medallists for Pakistan
Athletes (track and field) at the 1958 British Empire and Commonwealth Games
Athletes (track and field) at the 1962 British Empire and Commonwealth Games
Athletes (track and field) at the 1966 British Empire and Commonwealth Games
Medalists at the 1958 Asian Games
Medalists at the 1962 Asian Games
Medalists at the 1966 Asian Games
20th-century Pakistani people
Medallists at the 1958 British Empire and Commonwealth Games
Medallists at the 1962 British Empire and Commonwealth Games
Medallists at the 1966 British Empire and Commonwealth Games